Traces of My Lipstick is the third studio album by American R&B group Xscape. The album was released on May 12, 1998, through So So Def Recordings and Sony Music Entertainment. The album was preceded by the release of three singles: "The Arms of the One Who Loves You", "My Little Secret" and "Softest Place on Earth".

The album debuted at number 28 on the US Billboard 200 and number six Top R&B/Hip-Hop Albums chart. The album was certified Platinum by the RIAA the on June 21, 1999.

Background and release
"Traces of My Lipstick" was the group's first album in three years after the release of their second album Off the Hook (1995). As with previous albums Hummin' Comin' at 'Cha (1993) and Off the Hook (1995), the album was chiefly produced by Jermaine Dupri with Manuel Seal, Jr. and Daryl Simmons, with addition production from Babyface, Joe Thomas, Warryn Campbell and Keith Sweat.

Critical reception

The album was met with positive to mixed reviews from critics. 
Leo Stanley from Allmusic reviewed the album giving it a 3 out of 5 stating "On their third album, Traces of My Lipstick, Xscape pretty much follows the cue of their two earlier efforts, with only slightly diminished results. The group sounds as good as ever, bringing real soul and passion to their performances, but unfortunately much of their record consists of average, unremarkable material. There are enough strong songs (primarily the singles) to make the record enjoyable, but it simply doesn't have the same resonance as their two earlier efforts."

Singles
"The Arms of the One Who Loves You" was released as the lead single on February 14, 1998. The song peaked at number seven on the US Billboard Hot 100 chart and number four on the Hot R&B/Hip Hop Songs Chart. It sold 800,000 copies, earning a gold certification from the RIAA. "My Little Secret" was released as the album's second single on July 7, 1998. The song charted at number nine on the US Billboard Hot 100 chart and number two on the Hot R&B/Hip Hop Songs Chart. "Softest Place on Earth" was released as the album's third and final single on September 29, 1998. The song failed to impact on the Billboard Hot 100 but did chart at number twenty-eight on the Hot R&B/Hip Hop Songs Chart.

Other songs
"Am I Dreaming" is a song by Ol' Skool featuring Keith Sweat and Xscape and was released on January 27, 1998. The song peaked at number five on the Hot R&B/Hip Hop Songs Chart.

Commercial performance
Traces of My Lipstick debuted at number twenty-eight on the US Billboard 200 and number six on the Top R&B/Hip-Hop Albums chart, lower than their two previous albums. It eventually received platinum certification by the RIAA for more than one million copies shipped to stores.

Track listing

Notes
 denotes co-producer

Credits and personnel

Musicians
 Babyface, Bobby Crawford, Sean "Sep" Hall, William "P Sound" Thomas - drums
 Tomi Martin - guitar
 Michael Thompson - guitar
 George Wadenius - guitar
 Babyface, Sean "Sep" Hall, Guy Roche - keyboard

Production
 Executive producers: Jermaine Dupri, Michael Mauldin
 Producers: Babyface, Jermaine Dupri, Joe, Manuel Seal, Jr., Daryl Simmons, Keith Sweat, Warryn Campbell, Guy Roche
 Main performer: Xscape
 Additional vocals: Jagged Edge, Daryl Simmons, Ol' Skool, Foxy Brown
 Engineers: Brian Frye, Karl Heilbron, Chris Puram, Everett Ramos, Mike Seieizi, Brian Smith, Rich Tapper
 Mixing: Jermaine Dupri, Tom "TK" Kidd, Neil Pogue, Chris Puram, Ron A. Shaffer, Phil Tan, Dave Way
 Mixing assistance: John Frye, Kevin Lively, Alex Lowe, Thomas Rickert
 Drum programming: Babyface, Bobby Crawford, Sean "Sep" Hall, William "P Sound" Thomas
 Programming: Guy Roche, Joe Thomas

Charts

Weekly charts

Year-end charts

Certifications

References

1998 albums
Albums produced by Jermaine Dupri
Albums produced by Warryn Campbell
Xscape (group) albums